This is a list of Billboard magazine's Top Hot 100 songs of 1998.

See also
1998 in music
List of Billboard Hot 100 number-one singles of 1998
List of Billboard Hot 100 top-ten singles in 1998

References

1998 record charts
Billboard charts